Gaete may refer to:

In geography:
 Gaete, a hamlet in the Dutch province of North Brabant.
 Gaeta, a city and comune in the province of Latina, in Lazio, central Italy

In history:
 Gaete (people), ancient European people, also known as Dacians or Getae

In other uses:
 Eliana Gaete, a Chilean athlete